The ninth season of Deutschland sucht den Superstar was broadcast on German channel RTL from 7 January to 27 April 2012. Luca Hänni won the series. Jury members Fernanda Brandão and Patrick Nuo left DSDS and were replaced by Bruce Darnell and Cascada's Natalie Horler. As the winner, Luca Hänni received a recording contract with Universal Music Group and €500,000. Participants must be between the ages of 16 and 30 and living in Germany, Austria and Switzerland. The auditions stage had 34 audition events in 33 cities across Germany, Austria or Switzerland. 35,401 participants auditioned for season 9. Marco Schreyl will not be returning to host season 10.

Production

Changes include Fernanda Brandão and Patrick Nuo leaving the DSDS jury immediately after season 8 and were replaced by Bruce Darnell and Cascada's Natalie Horler. RTL decided to have a "Top 16" instead of a "Top 15". Participants sang in duets in the Top 6.

The audition cities were Soltau, Saarbrücken, Trier, Mannheim, Karlsdorf, Munich, Landshut, Stuttgart, Nuremberg, Freiburg, Zurich, Bern, Graz, Salzburg,  Berlin, Dresden, Leipzig, Magdeburg, Rostock, Bremen, Hamburg, Hanover, Osnabrück, Cologne, Dortmund, Koblenz, Aachen, Schüttorf, Vienna, Frankfurt, Kassel, Münster, Essen and a second time in Cologne. There were 35.401 participants that auditioned for season 9. Production for the Top 36 was in the Maldives.

The jury and host

Dieter Bohlen was born on 7 February 1954 in Oldenburg. He has been a judge on DSDS since season 1. He got his first job as a composer and producer in 1979. He is now the most successful German composer and producer. Bohlen and Thomas Anders, as members of Modern Talking, are the only German act with five titles in a row at number 1 on the German singles chart.

Season 9 is Natalie Horler's first season on the jury panel. She is the lead singer for Cascada. She was born in the United Kingdom and grew up in Germany. Horler is the daughter of David Horler.

Bruce Darnell was on born on 19 July 1957 in the US state of Colorado. He grew up in New York City. In 1983, he began his career as a model in Munich. He later moved to Cologne to continue his career as a model. Since 1990, Darnell worked as a choreographer and trained models for the catwalk. He was a judge on Germany's Next Topmodel and Das Supertalent. He replaced Patrick Nuo for season 9.

Marco Schreyl has been the host of DSDS since season 3. He was born on 1 January 1974 in Erfurt, East Germany and is a graduate of the University of Jena. He has also hosted Das Supertalent.

Auditions
The auditions for season 9 started on 27 August 2011. The deadline to apply for auditions was 15 August 2011. Participants must be between the ages of 16 and 30 and living in Germany, Austria or Switzerland. 34 Audition events were held in 33 cities.

"Recall"
The first recall show aired on 4 February. The 135 candidates who advanced to the Recall were split up into groups where the judges picked 60 candidates for the next round. The 60 candidates who advanced participated in groups and duets. The Top 36 went to the Maldives. Ole Jahn left voluntarily in the Top 36 due to health reasons.

Finalists
(Ages stated at time of contest)

Top 16 – "Jetzt oder nie"  (Now or Never)
Original airdate: 25 February 2012

Group Song: "Good Feeling"
Advancing to Top 10 (Public votes): Vanessa, Jesse, Thomas, Fabienne, Joey, Kristof, Luca, Daniele, Silvia and Hamed.
Eliminated in the Top 16 Show: Angel, Jana, Marcello, Ursula, Christian and Dennis.

Theme shows

Top 10 - "Hammer Hits"
Original airdate: 3 March 2012
 
Group Song:"Troublemaker"
Jury Elimination Forecast: Silvia Amaru
Bottom 3: Kristof Hering, Thomas Pegram, Silvia Amaru
Eliminated: Thomas Pegram

Top 9 - "Party Hits"
Original airdate: 10 March 2012
 
Group Song:"Party Rock Anthem"
Jury Elimination Forecast: Silvia Amaru or Joey Heindle
Bottom 3: Silvia Amaru, Kristof Hering & Jesse Ritch
Eliminated: Silvia Amaru

Top 8 - "Herzensongs für dich" (Songs from the heart for you)
Original airdate: 17 March 2012
 
Group Song: "I Came for You"
Jury Elimination Forecast: Joey Heindle
Bottom 3: Kristof Hering, Hamed Anousheh & Vanessa Krasniqi
Eliminated: Vanessa Krasniqi

Top 7 - "Ab in den Süden" (Let's go to the South)
Original airdate: 24 March 2012

Group Song:"I Was Made for Lovin' You"
Jury Elimination Forecast:Joey Heindle & Kristof Hering
Bottom 3: Hamed Anousheh, Kristof Hering & Jesse Ritch
Eliminated: Hamed Anousheh

Top 6 - "Solo & Duets"
Original airdate: 31 March 2012

Group Song: "Without You"
Jury Elimination Forecast: Jesse Ritch & Kristof Hering
Bottom 3: Joey Heindle, Kristof Hering & Fabienne Rothe
Eliminated: Kristof Hering

Top 5 - "Power Song vs. Unplugged"
Original airdate: 7 April 2012

Group Song: "Don't Wanna Go Home"
Jury Elimination Forecast: Fabienne Rothe & Joey Heindle
Bottom 3: Jesse Ritch, Fabienne Rothe & Joey Heindle
Eliminated: Joey Heindle

Top 4 - "Pop, Rock & Classic"
Original airdate: 14 April 2012

Group Song: "Turn This Club Around"
Jury Elimination Forecast: Fabienne Rothe
Bottom 2: Fabienne Rothe & Jesse Ritch
Eliminated: Fabienne Rothe

Top 3 - Semi-Final
Original airdate: 21 April 2012

Group Song: "Relight My Fire" & "Live My Life"
Jury Elimination Forecast: The jury was indecisive.
Bottom 2: Jesse Ritch & Luca Hänni
Eliminated: Jesse Ritch

Top 2 - Final (Contestants' Choice, Highlight Song & Winner's Single)
Original airdate: 28 April 2012

Group Song: "Good Feeling" (Top 10 Finalists), "There She Goes" & "Almost Lover" (Daniele & Luca)
Jury's Forecast of who will win: /
Winner: Luca Hänni
Runner-Up: Daniele Negroni

Elimination chart

On 24 February, Thomas Pegram became the 16th contestant after Bohlen chose him, which resulted in six instead of five contestants being eliminated on 25 February.
On 25 February, the public vote for the first time since season 4, the Top 10 alone. The judges did not have any rights to choose any contestants like in the seasons before.

Top 10 candidates

Luca Hänni

Luca Hänni was born on 8 October 1994 in Uetendorf, Switzerland. He was in an apprenticeship for bricklaying at the time. He can play the piano and the guitar and is a fan of Justin Bieber. He's considered a sex symbol on this show. He has been compared to Alexander Klaws. Luca was considered Dieter Bohlen's favorite to win the competition and eventually went on to win, becoming the first winner from Switzerland. At age 17, he became the youngest winner-to-date to win DSDS. He only stayed 2,5 minutes for the after-show party after he won season 9. As the winner, he received a recording contract with Universal Music Group and €500,000.

Daniele Negroni

Daniele Negroni was born on 31 July 1995 in Arona, Italy. He can play the drums and is a fan of James Blunt, James Morrison and Xavier Naidoo. He has played for and a fan of football club Borussia Mönchengladbach. He is a heavy smoker. In a conflict with fellow DSDS candidate Kristof Hering, he called Kristof a "faggot". He became the runner-up behind Luca Hänni.

Jesse Ritch
Jesse-Ritch Kama-Kalonji was born on 19 February 1992 in Urtenen-Schönbühl, Switzerland. He won a regional music competition in 2006. He has had minor roles in weddings and sang in a gospel choir. He took piano and singing lessons for five years in classical and pop and taught himself to play the guitar. His father is from the Congo. He likes to relax with singing, listening to music, cooking, or for a cozy evening with his girlfriend in front of the television. Music, shopping and football are among his biggest hobbies. He was eliminated in the Top 3.

Fabienne Rothe
Fabienne Rothe was born on 9 December 1995 in Dormagen. She is a member of the member of the Music Academy of Neuss. She is a fan of Tyler Ward, Justin Bieber and Usher. Before participating on DSDS, she auditioned twice on Das Supertalent in 2010 and 2011, respectively. She was rumoured to be in a relationship with fellow DSDS candidate Hamed Anousheh. Kristof Hering stated that Fabienne and Hamed went to bed with each other. Hamed denied this. Fabienne was crying when Hamed left the DSDS Villa. She told Bravo that "I've never had sex". She was the last female contestant and was eventually eliminated in the Top 4.

Joey Heindle

Joey Heindle was born on 14 May 1993 in Munich. He has five siblings. He trained as an assistant chef and has further training as a chef. He had to cancel training due to a hand injury. He can play the guitar. He has sung at birthday parties. His favourite singers are Elton John and Xavier Naidoo. He went shirtless for his Top 8 performance. He felt uncomfortable going shirtless. Joey stated (about being shirtless) "Actually, I did not want that, but did that because the director wanted." Joey called DSDS jury member Dieter Bohlen a "pussy" for the negative criticism he has given him. After the show, Joey stated "Dieter was a pussy. He's just went out and did not further heard. That was just simply sucks. That would make no man on earth in a talent show. This is an insult to the power of three". Joey also stated that his relationship in the long-term won't suffer because of this and he will forgive Dieter at some point. He was eliminated at the Top 5. Within days of being eliminated, he got a recording contract with music producer Mark Delgardo.

Kristof Hering

Kristof Hering was born on 27 February 1989 in Hanover. He lives with his boyfriend who is 30 years older than him. He has a tattoo on his left ankle. He has an older sister and younger brother. In 2008, he left home and went to a catholic gymnasium where he received his abitur. He is a fan of Udo Jürgens, Robbie Williams and Peter Maffay. He also likes jazz and pop. He likes to go shopping, listening to music, do sports with his friends. He has lost 25 pounds since 2008. He keeps it off by going to the gym three times a week. He was at the Stage-School-Hamburg in 2008 and 2009. His favourite songs includes "Über 7 Brücken" by Peter Maffay and "I Sing A Lied Für Du" by Andreas Gabalier. Kristof was eliminated in the Top 6. Kristof stated that "I'll miss the whole team, but none of the candidates." He believes fellow candidates Luca Hänni, Jesse Ritch and Fabienne Rothe are cold and calculating. suffered verbal and death threats during his participation during season 9 due to his homosexuality. People were writing stuff like "You are sooo gay to .."; "I'll cut your eggs"; "Get out of DSDS, if you value your life" and "I stab you up". RTL filed charges against unknown persons because of the threats.

Hamed Anousheh
Hamed Anousheh was born on 13 January 1987 in Trier. He currently resides in Cologne. He has an Iranian background. His parents fled Iran because of the Iranian Revolution. His father is among the five masters of Persian flute and played before the Queen. After his birth, the family moved back to Iran. His parents divorced and him and his siblings returned to Germany with their father. He is a fan of Michael Jackson. Hamed was eliminated in the Top 7. Hamed was rumoured to be in a relationship with fellow DSDS candidate Fabienne Rothe. Kristof Hering stated that Hamed and Fabienne went to bed with each other. Hamed denied this. Fabienne was crying hard when he left the DSDS Villa.

Vanessa Krasniqi

Vanessa Krasniqi was born on 22 June 1994 in Iserlohn. She is going for her Fachabitur and is currently in the 11th class. Her father is from Kosovo. She has a half-brother name Dardan. She became the fourth place at Das Supertalent in 2008. She was eliminated in the Top 8 on 17 March. Considered a frontrunner of her season, her early elimination shocked the judges and her fellow contestants. RTL stated that she won't return despite angry fans protesting.

Silvia Amaru
Silvia Amaru was born in Hamburg on 22 December 1990. She has an Italian background. She has sung for five years at the Alster sparrows and the Hamburg State Opera. She likes soul, R'n'B and Italian music. She is a fan of Alicia Keys, Whitney Houston and Lady Gaga. She was eliminated in the Top 9 on 10 March.

Thomas Pegram
Thomas Pegram was born on 14 January 1985 in Hohenems, Austria. His father is American. He can play violin, piano and electric guitar. He sang in his band at age 16 and wrote and recorded his own music in his home. He participated for Austria in the 2004 edition of the Eurovision Song Contest. He became the 16th participant of the Top 16. There had been a "Top 15" in the previous 4 seasons. He was eliminated in the Top 10 on 3 March. He stated in an interview with RTL that one of the reasons why he didn't go further is that the girls didn't consider him a heartthrob and fellow candidate Luca Hänni "can do much better".

Controversy

Voting error
During the Top 16 show Marco Schreyl read out an incorrect phone number for Christian Schöne. Following complaints that the error may have cost Schöne his place in the competition RTL started voting to see if viewers wanted to reinstate Schöne and give him a second chance. Approximately 1.4 million people voted in the poll, but the majority voted against Schöne returning. The remaining contestants who had already qualified for the "Top 10" announced that they were happy with the result.

Producer favouritism
On 25 April, three days before the final show was broadcast, Daniele Negroni was declared the winner on RTL's website. Hamburger Morgenpost published an article complaining that "amazingly" RTL were promoting a winners tour for Daniele Negroni "on an RTL ticket page". Another Negroni concert was also announced for 30 June 2012 at the MEP arena in Meppen. In the final TV show Luca Hänni was voted the winner of season 9, with Negroni finishing second.

Facebook predictions
At the start of the theme shows, the Hamburger Morgenpost suggested that Thomas Pegram's elimination was expected because of some of his statistics on the DSDS Facebook pages. He had the fewest "likes" of all the contestants, with only 4,105 people having clicked the button, and received only 813 comments after the official DSDS Facebook fanpage put up his photo. The following week Hamburger Morgenpost again suggested that Silvia Amaru's elimination was expected as she had the lowest "like" total of the remaining contestants. Silvia Amaru's photo had 4,761 "likes" while her competitors were around 10,000 on Sunday 11 March. The Morgenpost said that it should be "clear" to RTL that "Facebook is a power killer" for Deutschland sucht den Superstar. In the Top Eight show the following week, Kristof Hering had the fewest likes for his photo, but was not voted out of the show.

Employment laws
The Cologne district government had concerns that the show was violating employment laws that protect children, prohibiting minors from appearing on–stage after 10 PM. The issue had been raised the previous season when the appearance of Sebastian Wurth was judged to have contravened the law, with RTL receiving a 15,000 Euro fine for the incident. The season nine contestants affected were Daniele Negroni (16), Luca Hänni (17), Vanessa Krasniqi (17) and Fabienne Rothe (16). RTL decided to cancel the results shows for 7 April 14 and 21 April to avoid infringing the child labour laws.

Homophobia
Contestant Kristof Hering suffered abuse and death threats during his participation during season 9 due to being openly gay. Comments were posted on various websites making physical threats against Hering, including "I'll cut your balls"; "Get out of DSDS, if you value your life" and "I'll stab you up", prompting RTL to file charges against various individuals for making the threats. Hering also clashed with fellow contestant Daniele Negroni, with Hering calling Negroni "antisocial" prompting Negroni to publicly call Hering a "faggot".

Reception
TV ratings for season 9 were disappointing. None of the theme shows reached 5 million viewers. Season 1 averaged 8.09 million viewers and season 8 averaged 6.32 million viewers in the show's key demographic (ages 14 to 49). Only 4.71 million people watch the final show of season 9. This is the lowest viewership in the history of all the final shows of DSDS.

Aftermath
The winner, Luca Hänni, received a recording contract with Universal Music Group and €500,000. Within days of being eliminated, Joey Heindle got a recording contract with music producer Mark Delgardo.

Marco Schreyl, who has hosted DSDS since season 3, will not be returning to host season 10. Bruce Darnell and Natalie Horler both left the show after season 9.

References

External links 
 Official website

Season 09
2012 in German music
2012 German television seasons